Dittigheim is a district of Tauberbischofsheim with 915 residents.

Geography
Dittigheim is located south-east of Tauberbischofsheim in the Tauberfranken region of Franconia.

History
Dittigheim is one of seven districts of Tauberbischofsheim. The other districts are the town of Tauberbischofsheim, as well as Dienstadt, Distelhausen, Dittwar, Hochhausen and Impfingen.

Dittigheim was incorporated to Tauberbischofsheim during the local government reform in Baden-Württemberg on January 1, 1975.

References

External links

Villages in Baden-Württemberg
Main-Tauber-Kreis
Historic Jewish communities